Stéphane Lenormand is a French politician from Saint Pierre and Miquelon. He is a member of Archipelago Tomorrow and was President of the Territorial Council of Saint Pierre and Miquelon from 2017 to 2020.

Electoral history 
For legislative elections to the French Parliament, he contested Saint-Pierre-et-Miquelon's 1st constituency in both 2017 and 2022.

References 

Year of birth missing (living people)
Living people
21st-century French politicians
Archipelago Tomorrow politicians
People from Saint Pierre and Miquelon
Presidents of the Territorial Council of Saint Pierre and Miquelon
Deputies of the 16th National Assembly of the French Fifth Republic
Members of Parliament for Saint-Pierre-et-Miquelon